The Kip Brothers (1902) is an adventure novel written by Jules Verne, one of his Voyages extraordinaires. Karl and Pieter Kip are rescued after being castaways on an island in the South Seas. They help to put down a mutiny on the brig but are then accused of murdering the captain.

Publication history
2007, USA, Wesleyan University Press, 514 pp., 60 illus., First English translation

External links

 Les Frères Kip available at Jules Verne Collection 

1902 French novels
French adventure novels
French crime novels
Novels set in the Pacific Ocean
Novels set on ships
Novels by Jules Verne